Two ships of the Royal Navy have been named HMS Antrim, after County Antrim in Northern Ireland:
  was a  armoured cruiser launched in 1903. She served in World War I and was broken up in 1923.
  was a  launched in 1967. She was sold to the Chilean Navy in 1984 and renamed Almirante Cochrane after Thomas Cochrane.

References

Royal Navy ship names